Heissler Rafael Guillent Ecker (born 17 December 1986) is a Venezuelan professional basketball player for Guaiqueríes de Margarita and .

Professional career
In his pro club career, Guillent has played in both the South American 2nd-tier level FIBA South American League, and the South American top-tier level FIBA Americas League.

In October 2019, Guillent signed with Astros de Jalisco in Mexico. Guillent led the LNBP in assists.

In February 2021, Guillent signed with Guaiqueríes de Margarita in Venezuela.

National team career
Guillent has been a member of the senior men's Venezuelan national basketball team. With Venezuela's senior national team, he has played at the following tournaments: the 2011 FIBA Americas Championship, the 2013 FIBA Americas Championship, the 2014 South American Championship, where he won a gold medal, the 2015 Pan American Games, and the 2015 FIBA Americas Championship, where he won a gold medal, and was named to the All-Tournament Team.

He also played at the 2016 Summer Olympics.

References

External links
Instagram
FIBA Profile
Latinbasket.com Profile
RealGM.com Profile

1986 births
Living people
Astros de Jalisco players
Basketball players at the 2016 Summer Olympics
Basketball players at the 2019 Pan American Games
Bucaneros de La Guaira players
Guaiqueríes de Margarita players
Guaros de Lara (basketball) players
Fuerza Regia de Monterrey players
Olympic basketball players of Venezuela
Point guards
Sportspeople from Caracas
Venezuelan expatriate sportspeople in Colombia
Venezuelan men's basketball players
2019 FIBA Basketball World Cup players
Pan American Games competitors for Venezuela
Basketball players at the 2015 Pan American Games